Interior is an extinct town in Whitman County, in the U.S. state of Washington.

The community took its name from the Interior Warehouse Company.

References

Ghost towns in Washington (state)
Geography of Whitman County, Washington